United States Cyber Corps, the U.S military cyber forces, may refer to:

Current units
 United States Cyber Command (USCYBERCOM)
 Twenty-Fourth Air Force (AFCYBER)
 United States Army Cyber Command (ARCYBER)
 Cyber Branch (United States Army)
 U.S. Fleet Cyber Command
 Marine Corps Cyberspace Command (MARFORCYBER)

Defunct units
 Air Force Cyber Command (Provisional)
 U.S. Navy Cyber Forces (CYBERFOR)

See also
 Information Warfare Corps (U.S. Navy)
 Cyberwarfare in the United States